Kmenta is a surname. Notable people with the surname include:
 František Kmenta (born 1958), Czech race walker
 Jan Kmenta (1926–2016), Czech-American economist